Backesto Park is a park in San Jose, California, in the Northside neighborhood.

History

Backesto Park is named after John Pierre Backesto (1831-1890), a prominent San Jose physician in 1800s.

In 1890, after John Pierre's death, his widow, Anne Backesto, donated $30,000 to San Jose in order to found a park in his memory.

Backesto Park is home to a tiled memorial fountain to the Backesto family, installed in 1922, which is the oldest structure still in existence made by the Solon and Schemmel Tile Company, the famed Californian tile producer.

In 2017, the park's tennis courts were renamed in honor of Don Johnson, a San Jose community leader and tennis coach.

Location
Backesto Park is located in the Northside neighborhood.

It is also nearby to Japantown.

References

External links

Backesto Park at City of San José Parks & Recreation

Parks in San Jose, California